Agha Syed Liaqat Ali is a Pakistani politician who was a Member of the Provincial Assembly of Balochistan, from May 2013 to May 2018.

Early life 
He was born on 1 January 1946 in Pishin District.

Political career
He was elected to the Provincial Assembly of Balochistan as a candidate of Pashtunkhwa Milli Awami Party from Constituency PB-8-Pishin-I in 2013 Pakistani general election. He received 13,741 votes and defeated a candidate of Jamiat Ulema-e Islam (F).

References

Living people
Balochistan MPAs 2013–2018
1946 births